Harlingen is a railway station located in Harlingen, Netherlands. The station was opened on 27 October 1863 and is located on the Harlingen–Nieuweschans railway. Train services are operated by Arriva. 600m west of this station is Harlingen Haven, the terminus of the line. From 1904 to 1935, Harlingen was the terminus of the Stiens-Harlingen railway line. From Harlingen Haven there are ferry connections to Terschelling and Vlieland.

Train services

Bus services

Gallery

See also
 List of railway stations in Friesland

References

External links
NS website 
Dutch Public Transport journey planner 

Railway stations in Friesland
Railway stations opened in 1863
Railway stations on the Staatslijn B
Harlingen, Netherlands